Chivite is a traditional winery in Navarra, Spain, a family business dating back to 1647.

The grapes are grown on over 500 hectares using varieties:
Tempranillo
Garnacha
Merlot
Cabernet Sauvignon
Chardonnay
Moscatel de Grano Menudo, etc.

See also 
List of oldest companies

References

External links 
Homepage
Location on Google Maps

Wineries of Spain
Companies established in the 17th century
17th-century establishments in Spain